The second Keating ministry (Labor) was the 59th ministry of the Government of Australia. It was led by the country's 24th Prime Minister, Paul Keating. The second Keating ministry succeeded the first Keating ministry, which dissolved on 24 March 1993 following the federal election that took place on 13 March. The ministry was replaced by the first Howard ministry on 11 March 1996 following the federal election that took place on 2 March which saw the Liberal–National Coalition defeat Labor.

Cabinet

Outer ministry

Parliamentary Secretaries

Changes to the ministry
On 27 April 1993, following his success at the Dickson special election on 17 April, Michael Lavarch was appointed Attorney-General.

On 23 December 1993, Treasurer John Dawkins resigned from the ministry and from Parliament, and a reshuffle took place. Laurie Brereton and Gary Johns were appointed to the ministry.

On 30 January 1994, Alan Griffiths resigned from the ministry. 

On 1 March 1994, Ros Kelly resigned from the ministry following the sports rorts affair. 

On 25 March 1994, Graham Richardson resigned from the ministry citing ill health. Carmen Lawrence, who had replaced Dawkins at the 1994 Fremantle by-election, was appointed to the ministry. Con Sciacca and Gary Punch were promoted to ministers to fill earlier vacancies.

On 20 June 1995, Brian Howe resigned as Deputy Prime Minister, although retaining his Housing and Regional Development portfolio. The party room unanimously elected Kim Beazley to replace him.

See also 
 First Keating ministry

Notes

Ministries of Elizabeth II
Keating, 2
Australian Labor Party ministries
1993 establishments in Australia
1996 disestablishments in Australia
Cabinets established in 1993
Cabinets disestablished in 1996